Granite was a small railway station located at Granite, on the Mansfield line in Victoria, Australia.

It was opened as Falls Siding in 1892, to serve a nearby granite quarry, and had been re-named Granite by 1904. The station consisted of a wooden platform and was not staffed. Little used, it was closed in December 1951.

References

Railway stations in Australia opened in 1883
Railway stations closed in 1978
Disused railway stations in Victoria (Australia)
Mansfield railway line